William Leefe Robinson VC (14 July 1895 – 31 December 1918) was the first British pilot to shoot down a German airship over Britain during the First World War. For this, he was awarded the Victoria Cross (VC), the highest award for gallantry in the face of the enemy that can be awarded to British and Commonwealth forces. He was the first person to be awarded the VC for action in the UK.

His action marked a turning point in the war against the airship menace, and caused the German airship bombing campaign to falter. In the three months afterwards, five more airships were shot down using the combat techniques he had proven.

Early life
Robinson was born in Coorg, India, on 14 July 1895, the youngest son of Horace Robinson and Elizabeth Leefe. Raised on his parents' coffee estate, Kaima Betta Estate, at Pollibetta in Coorg, he attended Bishop Cotton Boys' School, Bangalore, and the Dragon School, Oxford, before following his elder brother Harold to St Bees School, Cumberland, in September, 1909. While there, he succeeded his brother as Head of Eaglesfield House in 1913, played in the Rugby 1st XV and became a sergeant in the school Officer Training Corps.

First World War
In August, 1914, he entered the Royal Military College, Sandhurst, and was gazetted into the Worcestershire Regiment in December. In March, 1915, he went to France as an observer with the Royal Flying Corps, to which he had transferred. After having been wounded over Lille, he underwent pilot training in Britain, before being attached to No. 39 (Home Defence) Squadron, a night-flying squadron at Sutton's Farm airfield near Hornchurch in Essex.

The V.C. action

On the night of 2/3 September 1916 over Cuffley, in what was then Essex, now Hertfordshire Lieutenant Robinson, flying a converted B.E.2c night fighter No. 2693, sighted a German airship – one of 16 which had left bases in Germany for the largest airship raid of the war over England. The airship he encountered was the wooden-framed Schütte-Lanz SL 11, although at the time and for many years after, it was misidentified as the Zeppelin L 21.
Robinson was in the air for several hours. After initially spotting the airship, he lost it in clouds. However, these two runs were unsuccessful. He then tried his third and last ammunition drum, and the airship burst into flames and crashed in a field behind the Plough Inn at Cuffley . Commander Hauptmann Wilhelm Schramm and his 15-man crew were killed.

In his combat report to his commanding officer, Leefe Robinson wrote:

The propaganda value of this success was enormous to the British Government, as it indicated that the German airship threat could be countered.

Celebrity

Robinson landed his damaged biplane at 2.45 a.m. to tremendous acclaim from the squadron, and immediately wrote his combat report. He woke up to find that he had become a national celebrity overnight. He was splashed across all the major newspapers, and young actresses from the West End jostled to get an introduction to him.  Tens of thousands of people made their way to see the remains of the airship at Cuffley, parts of which were sold by the Red Cross for charity fundraising mounted on pieces of card.

Just two days later, Robinson was awarded the Victoria Cross – thought to be the fastest on record – and received the medal on 9 September at Windsor Castle, with huge crowds of admirers and onlookers in attendance. Robinson was also awarded £3,500 in prize money and a silver cup donated by the people of Hornchurch. Unfortunately, on 16 September, he crashed his plane (2693) when attempting to take off for a night patrol. It was a total wreck; he escaped just before it was consumed by fire. This incident led to his being grounded, as he was too valuable a national figure, with a long string of official engagements, to run such risks. Only the propeller survived and is on public display in the Armoury of Culzean Castle in Ayrshire. It was given to the Marquess of Ailsa in thanks for letting his land at Turnberry be used for an RFC flying school.

However, the combat technique of using concentrated upward fire and mixed incendiary bullets had been proven by Leefe Robinson, and more successes quickly followed. On 23 September 1916, Frederick Sowrey, also of 39 Squadron, shot down the Zeppelin L.32. On the night of 1/2 October 1916, 2nd Lieutenant W. L. Tempest of 39 Squadron, flying a B.E.2c, spotted the Zeppelin L.31, illuminated by searchlights over southwest London, and shot it down with the loss of the entire airship crew. In all, five more German airships were destroyed by Home Defence B.E.2c interceptors between October and December 1916.

Western Front

 
After continual pestering of the authorities to allow him to return to active service, in April 1917 Robinson was posted to France as a flight commander with No. 48 Squadron, flying the then new Bristol F.2 Fighter.

On the first patrol over the lines, on 5 April Robinson's formation of six aircraft encountered the Albatros D.III fighters of Jasta 11, led by Manfred von Richthofen. Four were shot down. Robinson, flying Bristol F2A A3337, was shot down by Vizefeldwebel Sebastian Festner, and was wounded and captured.

He was posted as dead until two months later a letter arrived from him in a POW camp. During his imprisonment, he made several attempts to escape and was moved around to several camps, including Zorndorf and Holzminden. He was kept in solitary confinement at the latter camp for his escape attempts. It is thought his health was badly affected during his time as a prisoner.

Death

Robinson was repatriated in early December 1918, and was able to spend Christmas with his friends and family. However, this freedom was short-lived. He contracted the Spanish flu and died on 31 December 1918 at the Stanmore home of his sister, Baroness Heyking. It was thought that his imprisonment had left him particularly susceptible. He was buried at All Saints' Churchyard Extension in Harrow Weald, with great ceremony. Thousands turned up to line the route of the procession, which was led by the Central Band of the RAF, and a fly-past of aircraft dropped a wreath which was laid on the grave.

Memorials
A memorial to Robinson was erected on the East Ridgeway in Cuffley, close to the spot where the airship crashed. The site was donated by Mrs J M B Kidson of Nun Park, Northaw, and the monument itself was paid for by readers of the Daily Express newspaper.

The monument was unveiled in front of a large crowd on 9 June 1921, by Freddie Guest, the Secretary of State for Air. The inscription originally identified the airship as Z21, but this was corrected in 1966. It was renovated and ceremonially rededicated on 3 September 1986 by Air Chief Marshal Sir Michael Stear. It was restored again between December 2007 and March 2008 as it was subsiding on one corner. A service of commemoration was held on 31 December 2018 led by Reverend Christopher Kilgour, the Vicar of the Parish of Northaw and Cuffley, on the date of the 100th anniversary of Leefe Robinson's death. An exhibition of photographs and memorabilia relating to Robinson was displayed in Cuffley Hall afterwards.

A road is named after him (Robinson Close) in Hornchurch, Essex, on the site of the former Suttons Farm airfield. He appears in a short segment of a wartime newsreel, although the location and date of the recorded event are unknown. Robinson's name appears on the triple VC memorial in St Bees School chapel, which was dedicated in 1932. His name also appears on the memorial at the Madikeri (Coorg) museum.

He is commemorated by the name of the local Miller & Carter steakhouse just south of the cemetery, the Leefe Robinson VC on the Uxbridge Road, Harrow Weald. This building was originally opened as The Leefe Robinson Restaurant in 1954, and contained a display of artifacts including the propeller from a BE2c aircraft; however these were destroyed by a fire in the 1960s, but the name was preserved when it reopened as a Berni Inn.

In April 2010, to celebrate the 100th anniversary of the Great Northern Route extension that connects Grange Park to Cuffley, the First Capital Connect rail company named a Class 313 train Captain William Leefe Robinson VC.

See also
Reginald Warneford – another VC awarded for bringing down a Zeppelin.

References
Notes

 Cole, Christopher and E.F. Cheesman. The Air Defence of Great Britain 1914–1918. London: Putnam, 1984. .
 Delve, Ken. The Winged Bomb: History of 39 Squadron RAF. Earl Shilton, Leicester, UK: Midland Counties Publications, 1985. .

Bibliography
 Monuments to Courage (David Harvey, 1999)
 The Register of the Victoria Cross (This England, 1997)
 VCs of the First World War - Air VCs (P. G. Cooksley, 1999)

Further reading

External links

 Biography on First World War.com
 Location of grave and VC medal (Middlesex)
 VC on display at Spinks part of Lord Ashcroft's VC collection
  - newsreel of the unveiling of the Cuffley memorial.

1895 births
Military personnel of British India
1918 deaths
Worcestershire Regiment officers
Royal Flying Corps officers
Royal Air Force officers
British Army personnel of World War I
Royal Air Force personnel of World War I
British World War I recipients of the Victoria Cross
Royal Flying Corps recipients of the Victoria Cross
People educated at The Dragon School
People educated at St Bees School
British World War I prisoners of war
Deaths from the Spanish flu pandemic in England
World War I prisoners of war held by Germany
Bishop Cotton Boys' School alumni
British Army recipients of the Victoria Cross